Siam is a Colombian duo from Cali, Colombia made up of two singers Carlos Montaño and Carolina Nuñez, they are married. In 2009, they won the third series of El factor X, the Colombian edition of The X Factor. They were mentored by Jose Gaviria who also mentored their rivals, another group named Raza Pana who ended up as runners-up. The award was recording her debut album, in 2010 released their eponymous album Siam (2010) under the label EMI. In September 2011 they were nominated for Latin Grammy Award in the Pop vocal duo category. More later due to low sales, the group decided signed with Colombo Records and release a second album titled Las Cosas Que Nunca Nos Dijimos (2012).

History 
In the year 2000, the singers met in the Antonio María Valencia Conservatory in the Colombian city, Cali, where they were both studying music. Carolina Nuñez is from Cali and Carlos Montaño is from Cartago. Later in 2005 they frequently participated in the same presentations and this allowed a friendship. In 2009 they married. In the same year they moved to Bogotá, looking for new opportunities.

El Factor X 
When they arrived to Bogotá, planned offer their work in bar hopping with only a guitar, but this year appeared the third season of the El Factor X, and Carolina proposed to her husband that participate in the TV program, he disagreed with the fact because they had participated as soloist in the first season and only Carolina passed to the finals, and they distanced long time, other reason was that this season the program have the fame because the participants should have a bad history that tell, a history that could sold to the public. Siam won the third season of the program in 2009.

Discography

Studio albums

EPs
 Nuestra historia (2015)

Singles

Awards and nominations

Latin Grammy Awards 
A Latin Grammy Award is an accolade by the Latin Academy of Recording Arts & Sciences to recognize outstanding achievement in the music industry. Siam have received a nomination in 2011.

|-
| 2011 || Siam || Best Pop Album by a Duo/Group with Vocals ||

Premios Nuestra Tierra
A Premio Nuestra Tierra is an accolade that recognize outstanding achievement in the Colombian music industry. Siam have received a nomination.

|-
| style="text-align:center;" rowspan="4"|2014 || Themselves || Best Pop Solo Artist or Group  ||

See also 
Music of Colombia

References

External links

 

The X Factor winners
Colombian pop musicians
Living people
Musical groups established in 2009
Musical groups from Cali
Latin pop music groups
Year of birth missing (living people)
Male–female musical duos